John Champe may refer to:

John Champe (soldier) (1752–1798), American Revolutionary War soldier and double agent
John Leland Champe (1895–1978), American archaeologist